This is a timeline of first ambassadorial appointments of Iceland by country.

Timeline

References
List of Icelandic representatives (Icelandic Foreign Ministry website) 

Lists of firsts
Political timelines